Chruściel  is a village in the administrative district of Gmina Płoskinia, within Braniewo County, Warmian-Masurian Voivodeship, in northern Poland. It is located in the historic region of Warmia.

The village has a population of 365.

References

Villages in Braniewo County